The 2016–17 EuroLeague Women season is the 21st edition of EuroLeague Women under its current name. The season started on 26 October 2016.

Teams
Teams were confirmed by FIBA Europe on 22 June 2016.

Draw
17 teams registered for EuroLeague Women 2016–17, resulting in 15 direct qualifiers, and one preliminary round to be played between CB Conquero and CCC Polkowice. Following the withdrawal of Spanish club CB Conquero, CCC Polkowice promoted to the regular season.
16 EuroLeague Women teams will be drawn directly into two Regular Season groups of eight teams each. The clubs have been seeded based on the ranking of their performance in European club competitions in the last three seasons:

Regular season

Regular season will start on October 26, 2016 and will finish on February 22, 2017.

The four top teams of each group will qualify to the quarterfinals.

If teams are level on record at the end of the Regular Season, tiebreakers are applied in the following order:
 Head-to-head record.
 Head-to-head point differential.
 Point differential during the Regular Season.
 Points scored during the regular season.
 Sum of quotients of points scored and points allowed in each Regular Season game.

Group A

Group B

Quarter-finals
In the quarter-finals, teams playing against each other had to win two games to win the series. Thus, if one team win two games, before all three games have been played, the game that remain is omitted.

}

}
|}

Final four
Host Final Four – Yekaterinburg, Russia.

All times are local (UTC+5).

Semifinals

Third place game

Final

Statistical leaders

Points

Rebounds

Assists

See also
 2016–17 EuroCup Women

References

External links

 

2016–17 in European women's basketball leagues
EuroLeague Women seasons